Carbamoyl phosphate synthetase I  is a ligase enzyme located in the mitochondria involved in the production of urea.  Carbamoyl phosphate synthetase I (CPS1 or CPSI) transfers an ammonia molecule to a molecule of bicarbonate that has been phosphorylated by a molecule of ATP.  The resulting carbamate is then phosphorylated with another molecule of ATP.  The resulting molecule of carbamoyl phosphate leaves the enzyme.

Structure
In E. coli the single CPS that carries out the functions of CPSI and CPSII is a heterodimer with a small subunit and a larger subunit with about 382 and 1073 amino acid residues in size, although in mammals (and other vertebrates) the CPSI protein is encoded by a single gene.  The small subunit contains one active site for the binding and deamination of glutamine to make ammonia and glutamate.  The large subunit contains two active sites, one for the production of carboxyphosphate, and the other for the production of carbamoyl phosphate. Within the large subunit there are two domains (B and C) each with an active site of the ATP-grasp family.  Connecting the two subunits is a tunnel of sorts, which directs the ammonia from the small subunit to the large subunit.

Mechanism
The overall reaction that occurs in CPSI is:

2ATP + HCO3− + NH4+ →  2ADP + Carbamoyl phosphate + Pi

This reaction can be thought of occurring in three distinct steps.
 Bicarbonate is phosphorylated to form carboxyphosphate
 Ammonia attacks the carboxyphosphate, resulting in carbamate
 Carbamate is phosphorylated to give carbamoyl phosphate

Regulation

CPSI is regulated by N-acetylglutamate which acts as an obligate allosteric activator of CPS1. NAG, by binding to domain L4, triggers changes in the A-loop and in Arg1453 that result in changing interactions with the T′-loop of domain L3, which reorganizes completely from a β-hairpin in the apo form to a widened loop in the ligand-bound form. In this last form, the T′-loop interacts also with the tunnel-loop and the T-loop of the L1 domain, thus transferring the activating information to the bicarbonate-phosphorylating domain. This interaction with NAG and a second interaction, with a nucleotide, stabilise the active form of CPSI.
The necessity for this ligand also connects the high concentration of nitrogen, reflected in excess of glutamate and arginine to produce NAG, to an increase in CPSI activity to clear this excess.

Metabolism
CPSI plays a vital role in protein and nitrogen metabolism.  Once ammonia has been brought into the mitochondria via glutamine or glutamate, it is CPSI's job to add the ammonia to bicarbonate along with a phosphate group to form carbamoyl phosphate.  Carbamoyl phosphate is then put into the urea cycle to eventually create urea.  Urea can then be transferred back to the blood stream and to the kidneys for filtration and on to the bladder for excretion.

Related health problems
The main problem related to CPSI is genetics-based.  Sometimes the body does not produce enough CPSI due to a mutation in the genetic code, resulting in poor metabolism of proteins and nitrogen, as well as high levels of ammonia in the body.  This is dangerous because ammonia is highly toxic to the body, especially the nervous system, and can result in intellectual disability and seizures.

Notes

References

External links 
  GeneReviews/NCBI/NIH/UW entry on Urea Cycle Disorders Overview
 

EC 6.3.5
Urea cycle